Cardenal Caro may refer to:

 Cardenal Caro Province
 Cardenal Caro Department
 Cardinal José María Caro Rodríguez
 Instituto Cardenal Caro
 Avenida Cardenal José María Caro
 Cardenal Caro metro station

See also
 José María Caro (disambiguation)